Magnolia virginiana, most commonly known as sweetbay magnolia, or merely sweetbay (also laurel magnolia, swampbay, swamp magnolia, white bay, or beaver tree), is a member of the magnolia family, Magnoliaceae. It was the first magnolia to be scientifically described under modern rules of botanical nomenclature, and is the type species of the genus Magnolia; as Magnolia is also the type genus of all flowering plants (magnoliophytes), this species in a sense typifies all flowering plants.

Taxonomy
Magnolia virginiana was one of the many species described by Carl Linnaeus.

Description

Magnolia virginiana is an evergreen or deciduous tree to 30 m (100 ft) tall, native to the lowlands and swamps of the Atlantic coastal plain of the eastern United States, from Florida to Long Island, New York. Whether it is deciduous or evergreen depends on climate; it is evergreen in areas with milder winters in the south of its range (zone 7 southward), and is semi-evergreen or deciduous further north. The leaves are alternate, simple (not lobed or pinnate), with entire margins, 6–12 cm long, and 3–5 cm wide. The bark is smooth and gray, with the inner bark mildly scented, the scent reminiscent of the bay laurel spice.

The flowers are creamy white, 8–14 cm diameter, with 6-15 petal-like tepals. The flowers carry a very strong vanilla scent that can sometimes be noticed several hundred yards away.  The fruit is a fused aggregate of follicles, 3–5 cm long, pinkish-red when mature, with the follicles splitting open to release the 1 cm long seeds. The seeds are black but covered by a thinly fleshy red coat, which is attractive to some fruit-eating birds; these swallow the seeds, digest the red coating, and disperse the seeds in their droppings.

Cultivation
Magnolia virginiana is often grown as an ornamental tree in gardens, and used in horticultural applications to give an architectural feel to landscape designs.  It is an attractive tree for parks and large gardens, grown for its large, conspicuous, scented flowers, for its clean, attractive foliage, and for its fast growth. In warmer areas Magnolia virginiana is valued for its evergreen foliage.

The English botanist and missionary John Banister collected Magnolia virginiana in the southeastern United States in 1678 and sent it to England, where it flowered for Bishop Henry Compton.  This species was the first magnolia to be cultivated in England, although it was soon overshadowed by the evergreen, larger-flowered southern magnolia (M. grandiflora)

The sweetbay magnolia has been hybridized horticulturally with a number of species within subgenus Magnolia. These species include M. globosa, M. grandiflora, M. insignis, M. macrophylla, M. obovata, M. sieboldii and M. tripetala. Some of these hybrids have been given cultivar names and registered by the Magnolia Society.

Chemistry
Flowers contain the neolignans 3,5′-diallyl-2′,4-dihydroxybiphenyl, 4,4′-diallyl-2,3′-dihydroxybiphenyl ether, 5,5′-diallyl-2,2′-dihydroxybiphenyl and 3,5′-diallyl-2′-hydroxy-4-methoxybiphenyl.

Gallery

References

External links
Magnolia virginiana images at the Arnold Arboretum of Harvard University Plant Image Database
 Damery, Jonathan. "Founding fruit." Arnold Arboretum of Harvard University website, 28 August 2019. Accessed 27 April 2020.
 Friedman, William (Ned). "Seed dispersal in a magnolia: before and after." Posts from the Collections, Arnold Arboretum of Harvard University website, 5 September 2015. Accessed 27 April 2020.
"Magnolia [Virginiana a.] glauca, original drawing by Charles Edward Faxon." Library Featured Images, Arnold Arboretum of Harvard University website, 30 June 2016. Accessed 27 April 2020.
"Sweet bay magnolia - Magnolia virginiana." Arnold Arboretum of Harvard University website, 2016. Accessed 27 April 2020.
"Magnolia virginiana in eastern North America and Cuba". News, Arnold Arboretum of Harvard University website, 24 May 2011. Accessed 27 April 2020.

Magnolia virginiana images at bioimages.vanderbilt.edu
Interactive Distribution Map of Magnolia virginiana

virginiana
Trees of the Southeastern United States
Garden plants of North America
Bird food plants
Ornamental trees
Trees of the United States
Plants described in 1753
Taxa named by Carl Linnaeus
Trees of the Eastern United States
Trees of the Northeastern United States